The 1981 King Cup was the 23rd season of the knockout competition since its establishment in 1956. Al-Hilal were the defending champions but were defeated by Al-Nassr in the final. Al-Nassr won their 3rd title overall and first since 1976.

Bracket

Source: Al Jazirah

Round of 32
The matches of the Round of 32 were held on 15, 16 and 17 April 1981.

Round of 16
The Round of 16 matches were held on 22, 23 and 24 April 1981.

Quarter-finals
The Quarter-final matches were held on 30 April and 1 May 1981.

Semi-finals
The four winners of the quarter-finals progressed to the semi-finals. The semi-finals were played on 7 and 8 May 1981. All times are local, AST (UTC+3).

Final
The final was played between Al-Nassr and Al-Hilal in the Youth Welfare Stadium in Riyadh. This was Al-Nassr's 6th final and Al-Hilal's 7th final. This was the first meeting between these sides in King Cup finals.

Top goalscorers

References

1981
Saudi Arabia
Cup